Fat Wreck Chords (pronounced "Fat Records") is a San Francisco, California-based independent record label, focused on punk rock. It was started by NOFX lead singer Michael Burkett (better known as Fat Mike) in 1990.

The label has released material for many notable bands including NOFX, Good Riddance, Mad Caddies, Descendents, Me First and the Gimme Gimmes, The Loved Ones, Screeching Weasel, Propagandhi, Rise Against, Lagwagon, Strung Out, No Use for a Name, Frenzal Rhomb, Less Than Jake, Against Me!, Hi-Standard, Snuff, Consumed, Leftöver Crack, and Anti-Flag. Fat Wreck Chords has released 157 studio albums to date.

History

Fat Mike started his record label Wassail records in 1987. He put out two NOFX records, The PMRC 7” and Liberal Animation in 1988. In 1990, he changed the name of the label to Fat Wreck Chords and rereleased the NOFX 7”. In 1992, Fat Mike went on to produce Lagwagon, Propagandhi, and No Use for a Name. In 1993, the label released records by Rancid, Face to Face, and Strung Out. This was also the year when Erin Kelly Burkett started working full time at Fat and the label moved from a closet to a entire garage. Erin and Mike have run the label together since.

The label grew during the 1990s selling over a million records per year. It had eighteen employees and four offices.

A documentary about Fat Wreck Chords called 'A Fat Wreck' was released on October 25, 2016.

Business practice
One somewhat uncommon and defining characteristic of Fat Wreck Chords is that they only sign one-record deals with bands. This allows the bands working with Fat Wreck Chords to have a choice as to if and when they want to put a record out on the label. In some cases, bands have released albums on Fat Wreck Chords but also on other labels.

The label has never been a member of the Recording Industry Association of America as indicated on the frequently asked questions portion of the label's website: "Are we a member? Not only no, but FUCK NO! We spent three years having our label's name (which was misspelled) removed from their members list. A year went by, then our name showed up again on their fucking list! Who are these sonsabitches?! Needless to say, we're in the process of having our name removed again, but they aren't being too cooperative."

Politics
Many bands on this label participated in the campaign Punkvoter, which was started by Fat Mike and attempted to encourage the youth in the U.S. to vote in the 2004 U.S. presidential election for John Kerry and against George W. Bush.

Imprints
The label has had two subsidiaries over the years, Honest Don's and Pink and Black. Honest Don's released records from Chixdiggit and Teen Idols amongst others, while Pink & Black released albums from female-fronted bands like Fabulous Disaster and Dance Hall Crashers.

Fat Mike also advanced $50,000 to Chris Hannah and Jord Samolesky of Propagandhi which he recouped within months from sales of Propagandhi records to help them start up their own label, G7 Welcoming Committee, though G7WC is independent from Fat Wreck.

Discography

Compilation albums

Fat Wreck Chords regularly releases compilation albums, often to promote bands signed to the label, but also, since 2003, to raise funds for various charities. The earliest Fat Wreck Chords compilations all have titles with some reference to fatness.

Shortly after Fat Music Volume IV was released, Fat Wreck Chords released a similarly titled album, Short Music for Short People, which features 101 songs, all averaging approximately 30 seconds. The shortest song ("Short Attention Span" by the Fizzy Bangers) is only eight seconds, and the longest ("Out of Hand" by Bad Religion) is 40 seconds. Some of the songs were commissioned and recorded specifically for the album, while others were from the bands' pre-existing repertoires.

Since the last Fat Music album has been released, the Fat Wreck Chords compilations have been explicitly for charitable causes. Liberation: Songs to Benefit PETA is a benefit album for the animal rights organization PETA, and PROTECT: A Benefit for the National Association to Protect Children is a benefit album for the children's rights group PROTECT. Between Liberation and PROTECT, two other compilation albums were released in protest of President George W. Bush and his administration: Rock Against Bush, Vol. 1 and Vol. 2.

To celebrate 20 years of business Fat Wreck Chords released the 3-disc Wrecktrospective compilation on December 8, 2009. Disc 1 is composed of the label's greatest hits, disc 2 is composed of unreleased demos and rarities, and disc 3 is composed the Fat Club 7" series in its entirety.

Album series

Live in a Dive
Live in a Dive is a series of live albums recorded by Fat Wreck Chords. In order of release:

Fat Club Series

In addition to the Live in a Dive series, Fat Wreck Chords also released the Fat Club series of 7" vinyl records during 2001. The series was only available to mail-order subscribers which received one single every month. Fat Wreck Chords did not publish any information on the upcoming releases so subscribers would not know what they were about to receive until the record arrived in the post.

Although the Fat club series was limited to 1,300 copies for each single, the songs contained on the records were later released as the third disc of the Wrecktrospective collection.

Artists

Current bands

 Against Me!
 American Steel
 Bad Astronaut
 Bad Cop/Bad Cop
 Banner Pilot
 The Bombpops
 Bracket
 Chixdiggit!
 Cigar (band)
 Clowns
 The Copyrights
 C.J. Ramone
 Darius Koski
 Days N' Daze
 Dead to Me
 Dillinger Four
 Direct Hit
 Escape From The Zoo
 Face To Face
 Frenzal Rhomb
 Get Dead
 Good Riddance
 Hi-Standard
 Joey Cape
 Lagwagon
 The Last Gang
 The Lillingtons
 Mad Caddies
 MakeWar
 Me First and the Gimme Gimmes
 Mean Jeans
 Night Birds
 NOFX
 No Use For a Name
 PEARS
 The Real McKenzies
 Sick of It All (for North America releases, ROW is Century Media Records)
 Snuff
 Strung Out
 The Suicide Machines
 Sundowner
 Swingin' Utters
 Teenage Bottlerocket
 Tommy and June
 ToyGuitar
 Uke-Hunt
 Useless ID
 Western Addiction
 Zach Quinn

Former bands

 88 Fingers Louie (active with Bird Attack Records)
 Anti-Flag (active with Spinefarm Records)
 The Ataris (active with Paper + Plastick)
 Avail (disbanded)
 Big In Japan
 Bullet Treatment
 Citizen Fish (active with Alternative Tentacles)
 Cobra Skulls (disbanded)
 Consumed (active with no label)
 Descendents (active with Epitaph Records)
 The Dickies (active with Dream Catcher Records)
 Diesel Boy (disbanded)
 Epoxies (disbanded)
 The Fight (active with Repossession Records)
 The Flatliners (active with Rise Records)
 Goober Patrol (active with Hulk Räckorz)
 Guns n' Wankers (disbanded)
 Leftöver Crack (active with Tankcrimes)
 Less Than Jake (active with Pure Noise Records)
 The Lawrence Arms (active with Epitaph Records)
 The Loved Ones (disbanded)
 Love Equals Death (disbanded)
 Masked Intruder (active with Pure Noise Records)
 Morning Glory (active with Buyback Records)
 MxPx (active with Rock City Recording Company)
 Nerf Herder (active with Oglio Records)
 None More Black  (disbanded)
 Only Crime (active with Rise Records)
 Paint It Black (active with No Idea Records)
 Pour Habit (active with no label)
 Propagandhi (active with Epitaph Records)
 Rancid (active with Hellcat Records)
 Rise Against (active with Loma Vista Recordings)
 The Sainte Catherines (disbanded)
 Screeching Weasel (active with Recess Records) 
 Screw 32 (disbanded)
 Smoke or Fire (on hiatus)
 The Soviettes 
 Star Fucking Hipsters (disbanded music available via Tankcrimes)
 Strike Anywhere (active with Bridge 9 Records)
 Subhumans (active with Bluurg Records)
 Tilt (disbanded)
 Tony Sly (deceased)
 Wizo (active with Hulk Räckorz; Fat Wreck only handled North American distribution)
 Zero Down (disbanded)

See also
 List of Fat Wreck Chords compilation albums
 List of record labels

References

External links
 

 
Punk record labels
Record labels established in 1990
Companies based in San Francisco
1990 establishments in California